Kimemia is a name of Kenyan origin that may refer to:

 Francis Kimemia (born 1957), Kenyan civil servant currently Secretary to the Cabinet of Kenya
 Amos Kabiru Kimemia, former member of parliament from Nakuru County
 Josiah Munyua Kimemia, former member of parliament from Nyandarua County

 
  

Kenyan names